{{DISPLAYTITLE:C8H14N2O4}}
The molecular formula C8H14N2O4 (molar mass: 202.21 g/mol, exact mass: 202.0954 u) may refer to:

 Coprine
 Diisopropyl azodicarboxylate (DIAD)

Molecular formulas